Yakup Satar (11 March 1898 – 2 April 2008) is believed to have been the last Turkish veteran of the First World War. He died at age 110.

Born in Crimea, Satar joined the army of the Ottoman Empire in 1915. On 23 February, 1917, he was taken prisoner by the British in the Baghdad campaign's Second Battle of Kut. Freed after the end of the war, Satar then served in the forces of Mustafa Kemal Atatürk in the Turkish War of Independence, which lasted from 1919 to 1923.

Shortly before his 110th birthday, he was treated for a minor infection at a military hospital before being released home, where he lived with his daughter in the Seyitgazi district of Eskişehir. He died soon after turning 110. 

His memories from the War of Independence and his daily life along with those of two other veterans, Ömer Küyük and Veysel Turan, are depicted in the documentary film Son Buluşma (2007) by Nesli Çölgeçen.

See also
 Crimean Tatars
 List of last surviving World War I veterans by country
 Mustafa Şekip Birgöl, last veteran of the Turkish War of Independence

References

External links
 The Times: Yakup Satar, The last Turkish veteran of the First World War who also fought for the independence of Turkey

1898 births
2008 deaths
People from Eskişehir
Turkish people of Crimean Tatar descent
Ottoman military personnel of World War I
Ottoman prisoners of war
Members of Kuva-yi Milliye
Turkish military personnel of the Turkish War of Independence
Turkish centenarians
World War I prisoners of war held by the United Kingdom
Men supercentenarians
Emigrants from the Russian Empire to the Ottoman Empire